Nei Tituaabine, is a red-haired maiden in Micronesian mythology, specifically in Kiribati.

She fell in love with the giant, red-haired chief, Auriaria, but they had no children.  After her death, three trees grew from her grave: a coconut from her head, a pandanus from her heels and an almond from her navel.  She became a tree goddess.

Kiribati mythology
Micronesian deities
Tree goddesses